Dança dos Famosos 2015 is the twelfth season of the Brazilian reality television show Dança dos Famosos which premiered on August 2, 2015, with the competitive live shows beginning on the following week on August 9, 2015 at 7:30 p.m./6:30 p.m. (BRT/AMT) on Rede Globo.

On December 6, actress Viviane Araújo & Marcelo Grangeiro won the competition over Malhação cast member Arthur Aguiar & Mayara Araújo and Zorra cast member Mariana Santos & Marcus Lobo, who took 2nd and 3rd place respectively.

Couples

Elimination chart

Key
 
 
  Eliminated
  Bottom two
  Dance-off
  Winner
  Runner-up
  Third place

Weekly results

Week 1 

 Presentation of the Celebrities

Aired: August 2, 2015

Week 2 
Week 1 – Men
Style: Disco
Aired: August 9, 2015

Running order

Week 3 
Week 1 – Women
Style: Disco
Aired: August 16, 2015

Running order

Week 4 
Week 2 – Men
Style: Forró
Aired: August 23, 2015

Running order

Week 5 
Week 2 – Women
Style: Forró
Aired: August 30, 2015

Running order

Week 6 
Week 3 – Men
Style: Rock
Aired: September 6, 2015

Running order

Week 7 
Week 3 – Women
Style: Rock
Aired: September 13, 2015

Running order

Week 8 
Week 4 – Men
Style: Funk
Aired: September 20, 2015

Running order

Week 9 
Week 4 – Women 
Style: Funk
Aired: September 27, 2015

Running order

Week 10 
Dance-off
Style: Waltz
Aired: October 4, 2015

Running order

Week 11 
Team A
Style: Foxtrot
Aired: October 18, 2015

Running order

Week 12 
Team B
Style: Foxtrot
Aired: October 25, 2015

Running order

Week 13 
Top 7
Style: Lambada
Aired: November 1, 2015

Running order

Week 14 
Top 6
Style: Salsa
Aired: November 8, 2015

Running order

Week 15 
Top 5
Style: Frevo
Aired: November 22, 2015

Running order

Week 16 
Top 4
Style: Pasodoble
Aired: November 29, 2015

Running order

Week 17 
Top 3
Styles: Samba & Tango
Aired: December 6, 2015

Running order

References

External links
 

2015 Brazilian television seasons
Season 12